Nastasia Nadaud (born 2004) is a French professional golfer and Ladies European Tour player. In 2022, she won the German Girls Open, the European Girls' Team Championship and the Göteborg Ladies Open.

Early life and amateur career
Nadaud was born in Chambéry and learned to play at Aix-les-Bains Golf Club.

In 2020, Nadaud was runner-up at the  Grand Prix De Saint Donat and the Grand Prix de Montpellier Massane, and finished 3rd at the French International Ladies Amateur Championship, four strokes behind winner Charlotte Liautier. In 2021, she won the Championnat de France Cadettes. 

In 2022, Nadaud graduated with a baccalaureate in June and won the German Girls Open the same month. She represented France at the European Girls' Team Championship in Iceland, where her France beat Sweden 4 to 3 in the final.

Nadaud made three LET starts and five on the LET Access Series in 2022 as an amateur. She held the lead at the Lacoste Ladies Open de France after an opening round of 65 (–6).

She won one of the five LETAS events in Sweden, the Göteborg Ladies Open wire-to-wire, and finished 16th in the Order of Merit, earning an exemption into the LET Q-School Final Qualifier at La Manga Club.

Professional career
Nadaud secured a card for the 2023 Ladies European Tour after she finished 3rd at LET Q-School 2022, where she several times held the outright lead.

Amateur wins
2019 Grand Prix du Golf Club de Lyon
2022 Qualifications Trophée Esmond in Paris (StrokePlay)
2022 German Girls Open 

Source:

Professional wins (1)

LET Access Series wins (1)

Team appearances
Amateur
European Girls' Team Championship (representing France): 2022 (winners)

References

External links

French female golfers
Ladies European Tour golfers
Sportspeople from Chambéry
2004 births
Living people
21st-century French women